The 2015–16 Sacramento State Hornets women's basketball team represented California State University, Sacramento during the 2015–16 NCAA Division I women's basketball season. The Hornets, led by third year head coach Bunky Harkleroad and played their home games at Hornets Nest. They were members of the Big Sky Conference. They finished the season 14–17, 10–8 in Big Sky play to finish in seventh place. They advanced to the quarterfinals to the Big Sky women's tournament where they lost to Eastern Washington.

Roster

Schedule

|-
!colspan=9 style="background:#004840; color:#B39650;"| Non-conference regular season

|-
!colspan=9 style="background:#004840; color:#B39650;"| Big Sky regular season

|-
!colspan=9 style="background:#004840; color:#B39650;"| Big Sky Women's Tournament

See also
 2015–16 Sacramento State Hornets men's basketball team

References

Sacramento State Hornets women's basketball seasons
Sacramento State